Krafton Inc. is a South Korean video game holding company based in Bundang-gu, Seongnam. It was created in November 2018 to serve as the parent company for Bluehole, founded by Chang-Byung-gyu in Seoul in March 2007, and its subsidiaries. The company has produced or owns the rights to several notable video game titles including TERA, PUBG: Battlegrounds, New State Mobile, and Moonbreaker. According to Forbes, Chang has a net worth of $2.9 billion and is one of the seven gaming billionaires in South Korea.

History
Following the success of PlayerUnknown's Battlegrounds which had led to both investment from Tencent Holdings and expansion and acquisition of studios, Bluehole opted to establish Krafton on 5 November 2018 to serve as a holding company for its video game properties. "Krafton" was selected based on the names of craft guilds of the Middle Ages. Kim Chang-han, the CEO of the PUBG Corporation (current PUBG Studios) that developed PlayerUnknown's Battlegrounds, was named as CEO for Krafton.

The company announced its plans to file for an initial public offering in July 2021, filing its initial approval for listing on the Korea Stock Exchange in April 2021.

Shares of several Chinese and foreign video game companies, including Tencent, which is the largest video game company in China and a provider for foreign companies to publish games in their country, fell due to new restrictions imposed by the Chinese government. Video games are viewed as an 'electronic drug' and a 'spiritual opium', especially shooting videogames, which according to the Chinese government promote violence. China is a very important market for video games due to its population density, hence the collapse of companies is devastating for every videogame company, including Krafton.

Subsidiaries 
Bluehole has acquired several development studios since its founding. On 5 November 2018, all subsidiaries were reorganized under one parent company: Krafton Game Union.

Bluehole Studio 

Bluehole Studio was founded in Seoul in March 2007 by Chang Byung-gyu. Chang previously established Neowiz in 1997, along seven other co-founders, moved on to found search engine developer First Snow in 2005, and sold that venture in 2006. The company announced on 22 April 2015 that they had changed their name to simply Bluehole.

In August 2017, Chinese holding company Tencent announced that it had, following a rejected acquisition bid, invested an undisclosed amount of money into Bluehole. Bluehole initially denied that any investment had been made, but later stated that they were in talks with Tencent in multiple partnerships, including the acquisition of an equity stake in Bluehole by Tencent. Tencent reaffirmed their intents to fully acquire Bluehole in November 2017. Korean magazine The Korea Times suggested that an initial public offering, through which Bluehole would become a public company, was "out of question" due to Chang Byung-gyu's position as chairman of both Bluehole and the Fourth Industrial Revolution committee. Tencent plans to invest further  to acquire further 10% ownership, raising their total stake to 11.5%.

PUBG Studios 

PUBG Studios (formerly Ginno Games, Bluehole Ginno Games and PUBG Corporation) is an internal studio of Bluehole's that developed one of the establishing battle royale games, PlayerUnknown's Battlegrounds (PUBG), based on user mods in other games by Brendan "PlayerUnknown" Greene and who was hired by PUBG Studios to develop it into a full title. Originally, Ginno Games had been founded by Kim Chang-han to develop MMOs, but around 2014, he had been forced to lay off a third of his staff as their last product had not performed well. He sold Ginno Games to Bluehole on 27 January 2015, with the sale to close on 27 March that year. At the time, Ginno Games employed 60 people. Ginno Games changed their corporate name to Bluehole Ginno Games in May 2015. Shortly after Bluehole's acquisition in 2015, Chang-ha reached out to Greene to offer him support to build out his battle royale at Bluehole Ginno, which Greene accepted. PUBG was first released in early access in March 2017 as a highly popular game. Following the success of PUBG in 2017, Bluehole Ginno Games was renamed PUBG Corporation in September 2017.

A second office was established in Madison, Wisconsin in late 2017, with two further offices in Amsterdam and Japan opened later. On 12 March 2018, PUBG Corporation acquired New York-based studio MadGlory, which was renamed PUBG MadGlory.

Greene, having been based in the Seoul offices of PUBG Corporation, left that division in March 2019 to lead a new subsidiary, PUBG Special Projects, at the Amsterdam office, later renamed to PUBG Productions. PUBG Productions announced their first game Prologue at The Game Awards 2019 in December. Unrelated to Battlegrounds, Prologue is called an exploration of gameplay and technology, and said "to give players unique and memorable experiences, each and every time they play".

At the end of 2019 Tencent Games announced some big plans for PUBG in India's upcoming future, as well as its general eSports.

Krafton fully merged PUBG Corporation into their internal studio system in December 2020, rebranding the team as PUBG Studios.

On 9 November 2020, it was announced that Krafton will participate in G-Star 2020 to introduce their upcoming multiplayer online game Elyon through Krafton, an e-sports reality show where celebrities and streamers entered a special school that specialized in battlegrounds conduct episodes and talk related to PUBG Series 3. Celebrities (G)I-dle's Song Yuqi and Ailee and streamers Chyo Man and Choi Kwang-won appeared in the show.

In September 2020, the Government of India banned PUBG Mobile in the country along with several apps published by Chinese vendors, in this case Tencent Games, due to data privacy issues. To relaunch the game back in India, Krafton took back the control of Intellectual Property (IP) of the game for the Indian region from Tencent. An aesthetically new version of PUBG Mobile, Battlegrounds Mobile India, was launched on 2 July 2021 for Android and on 18 August 2021 for iOS. This time the game was published by Krafton, Inc.

In February 2021, PUBG Studios announced the development of PUBG: New State, the second installment in the PUBG Universe, set in the future (2051). Drones, shields, weapon customization, neon sights, reviving teammates and 'recruiting' knocked out enemies are just some of the new mechanics in PUBG: New State. The game released on 11 November 2021, and reported through a presentation that to date the game had exceeded 55 million pre-registrations on Google Play and App Store. On 27 January, 2022, a name change was announced, going from being called "PUBG: New State" to being called "New State Mobile". According to Krafton this was done to create a unique mobile-centric experience, and through that change they were putting it into practice.

Striking Distance Studios 

In June 2019, a new studio called Striking Distance was opened in conjunction with Glen Schofield, the co-founder of Sledgehammer Games. Striking Distance, headed by Schofield as chief executive officer, is set to develop narrative-driven games based on PUBG. The studio's first game is The Callisto Protocol, a survival horror game originally (but no longer) set within the PUBG universe. It was released on December 2 2022.
Striking Distance Studios is headquartered in San Ramon, California.

RisingWings 

RisingWings is a game development company formed by the merger of Pnix and Delusion. RisingWings is responsible for Archery King, Golf King, Castle Craft: World War and other mobile games.  RisingWings in based in Seoul.

Dreamotion Inc. 

Dreamotion is a South Korean video game development company founded in July 2016. They are the developer and publisher of GunStrider: Tap Strike, Road to Valor: World War II and Ronin: The Last Samurai, and others.  Dreamotion was acquired by Krafton on 13 May 2021.
Dreamotion is headquartered in Seal Beach, California.

Thingsflow 
Thingsflow Inc. an interactive content production company known for Hellobot, a chat-based content platform that allows users to engage with bot-driven characters through dedicated apps and messenger services. As of May 2021, Hellobot has more than four million users throughout Korea and Japan. On 29 June 2021 this company was acquired by Krafton.

Unknown Worlds Entertainment 
Unknown Worlds Entertainment, based in San Francisco, California, is a company founded in 2001 known for having developed games such as Natural Selection and Subnautica.  This company was acquired by Krafton in October 2021. In August 2022, it was announced that the company will develop Moonbreaker, a turn based role-playing game which will be published by Krafton.

5minlab Corporation 
5minlab is a South Korean company founded in 2013, known for developing Smash Legends, Baam Squad, Toy Clash, among others.  It is also known for developing live Q&A broadcast systems and providing AR/VR software and content to large corporations and broadcast companies. This company was acquired by Krafton in February 2022.

Neon Giant 
In November 2022, it was announced Krafton had acquired the Uppsala-based developer of The Ascent, Neon Giant.

Defunct subsidiaries

L-Time Games 

L-Time Games was founded in June 2009. L-Time Games was acquired by and merged into Bluehole in January 2014.

Maui Games 

Maui Games was a mobile game developer founded in 2013 by Woonghee Cho, previously head of business development for Neowiz. Bluehole Studio announced on 16 January 2015 that they were acquiring the company, which was completed in October that year. At Bluehole's January 2017 shareholders' meeting, it was decided that Maui Games would enter liquidation, which was effective immediately. Nine staff members of Maui Games, a fraction of that company's total employee count, were reemployed directly within Bluehole.

Pnix 
Pnix (formerly Bluehole Pnix) was a mobile game developer. The company was founded as Pnix Games in 2012. Bluehole announced that they had acquired Pnix Games, alongside Squall, on 22 April 2015. Pnix Games changed their corporate name to Bluehole Pnix in June 2016. Corporate name again changed to Pnix in 2018 after being a subsidiary of Krafton. In 2020 Pnix was merged with Delusion to form a RisingWings.

Squall 

Squall (formerly Bluehole Squall) was a mobile game developer. The company was founded as Squall by Park Jin-seok, a founding member of Neowiz, in 2013. Bluehole announced that they had acquired Squall, alongside Pnix Games, on 22 April 2015. Squall changed their corporate name to Bluehole Squall in March 2016. Corporate name again changed to Squall in 2018 after being a subsidiary of Krafton. It was shut down by Krafton after internal conflicts in 2020.

Red Sahara Studio 

Red Sahara Studio was a mobile game developer headed by Lee Ji-hoon. On 12 March 2018, Bluehole completed the acquisition of the studio in a stock swap deal. Red Sahara was developing a mobile game based on TERA.

Delusion 

Delusion Studio was founded in April 2011 and is headed by Kang Moon-chul. On 22 June 2018, Bluehole announced the acquisition of the studio. Delusion developed mobile games such as Guardian Stone, Jellipo, House of Mice and, most notably, Castle Burn.
In 2020 Delusion was merged with Pnix to form RisingWings.

En Masse Entertainment 

En Masse Entertainment was Krafton's North American publishing arm. The company was established as Bluehole Interactive in June 2008. On 26 February 2010, the company announced that it had changed its corporate name to En Masse Entertainment.

In September 2020, En Masse Entertainment announced that it would be shutting down its offices after 10 years of service in the gaming industry, where it was decided that Krafton would be publishing TERA's Console version globally - taking over a self-publishing role, in place of En Masse Entertainment, whereas the PC version would be published by Gameforge.

Games

Games developed or published as "Bluehole Studio"

Games developed or published as "Krafton"

References

External links 
 

Bundang
Tencent
Companies based in Gyeonggi Province
Video game companies established in 2018
Video game companies of South Korea
Video game development companies
South Korean companies established in 2018
Holding companies of South Korea
2021 initial public offerings
Companies listed on the Korea Exchange